Fei Dongbin (born August 1970) is a Chinese politician who is the current director of the National Railway Administration, in office since September 2022.

He is a representative of the 20th National Congress of the Chinese Communist Party. He was a delegate to the 12th and 13th National People's Congress.

Early life and education
Fei was born in Jinzhou, Liaoning, in August 1970. In 1987, he entered Changsha Railway College (now Central South University), majoring in railroad transportation. He joined the Chinese Communist Party (CCP) in March 1996.

Career in railway system
After graduating in 1991, he was assigned to Shenyang Railway Bureau, where he eventually served as chief engineer and deputy director in 2006. In May 2007, he was appointed executive deputy general manager of the Qinghai-Tibet Railway Company (now China Railway Qingzang Group), but having held the position for only one year. He served in the Transportation Bureau of the Ministry of Railways for four months in 2008 and soon was chosen as executive deputy director of the Beijing Railway Bureau in October 2008. In April 2009, Fei was appointed executive deputy director of the Jinan Railway Bureau, he remained in that position until January 2013, when he was transferred to Inner Mongolia and appointed director of the Hohhot Railway Bureau.

Political career
He served a short term as deputy party secretary of Hohhot and secretary of the Political and Legal Affairs Commission in 2016. In October 2016, he was named acting mayor of Ulanqab, confirmed in January 2017. He was elevated to party secretary, the top political position in the city, in June 2020.

Fei was promoted to vice governor of Henan in April 2021 and six months later was admitted to member of the Standing Committee of the CCP Henan Provincial Committee, the province's top authority.

Career in railway system
In September 2022, he was made party branch secretary of the National Railway Administration, concurrently holding the director position.

References

1970 births
Living people
People from Jinzhou
Central South University alumni
Tsinghua University alumni
People's Republic of China politicians from Liaoning
Chinese Communist Party politicians from Liaoning
Delegates to the 12th National People's Congress
Delegates to the 13th National People's Congress
Mayors of Ulanqab